The Loma Mountains are the highest mountain range in Sierra Leone. The area has been designated a non-hunting forest reserve since 1952. The reserve covers an area of 33,201 hectares.

See also
 Protected areas of Sierra Leone

References

Afromontane
Guinean montane forests
Mountain ranges of Sierra Leone
Northern Province, Sierra Leone
Protected areas of Sierra Leone